Pizzarello is a traditional Italian food from Apulia, a region in southern Italy. Its original name in the local dialect is Pizzaridd.  The Pizzarello is a long salty baked bread, seasoned with tomatoes and sometimes also with olives. The baking makes it crunchy.

Origins

Christians wake up early on Good Friday, in the week of Easter. As they had a long fasting day, during which they could not eat meat, stalls in the streets sold a typical sandwich filled with cheese, tomatoes and other vegetables.

The typical Pizzaridd, originally made only for Good Friday, became over time a food produced in some towns, such as Terlizzi, for eating on Fridays generally. The name seems close to "pizza", but the kneading is different.

References 

Italian cuisine
Pizza varieties